The 2014 Sydney Darts Masters was the second staging of a tournament by the Professional Darts Corporation, as a fourth and final entry in the 2014 World Series of Darts. The tournament took place at Hordern Pavilion, Sydney, Australia, between 28–30 August 2014. The tournament featured eight top PDC players and eight qualifiers competing in a knockout system.

Phil Taylor retained his title by beating Stephen Bunting 11–3 in the final.

Prize money
The total prize fund was £73,000.

Qualifiers
The eight PDC players (with the top 4 seed) were:
  Michael van Gerwen (first round)
  Phil Taylor (winner)
  Simon Whitlock (quarter-finals)
  Peter Wright (quarter-finals)
  Dave Chisnall (quarter-finals)
  James Wade (semi-finals)

The two PDC wildcards were:
  Raymond van Barneveld (first round)
  Stephen Bunting (runner-up)

The regional qualifiers were:

Draw

Broadcasting
The tournament was available in the following countries on these channels:

References

Sydney Darts Masters
Sydney Darts Masters
Sports competitions in Sydney
World Series of Darts